Thameside is a bus company operating in East London. It is a subsidiary brand of Stagecoach London and operates services under contract to Transport for London. The brand is not publicly used since 2010 as all buses are branded as Stagecoach, but it exists as a legal entity.

Thameside shares its headquarters with sister company East London at West Ham.

History
Thameside was set up to operate route 248 from 27 September 2008. In March 2009 route 372 was transferred followed in July 2009 by route 174. In March 2011, route 287 was transferred from Barking (BK) Garage to this garage upon contract renewal. 
On 28 September 2013 route 165, route 252, route 256 and route 365 commenced operations after they were won from First London (except 256 Which was previously run by Arriva). route 103 was transferred from Romford (NS) on 27 June 2015. The route was then won by Arriva and commenced on 14 October 2017. route 499 was transferred from Romford (NS) Garage to this garage on 24 August 2019 followed by route 496 which transferred on 12 October. Route 248 was won by Arriva London on 24 September 2022.

Garage
Thameside operates one bus garage.

Rainham (RM)
As at September 2022, 165, 174, 252, 256, 287, 365, 372, 496 and 499.

History
The garage was opened in 2007 after Waterden Road was closed to allow the site to be redeveloped for the 2012 Olympic Games.

In May 2008, all buses along with the trainers were moved into the new West Ham garage, meaning Rainham no longer operated any Transport for London routes. Rainham carried out all the engineering work until the new West Ham garage was completed in 2009.

Transport for London routes returned to Rainham on 27 September 2008 when route 248 commenced.

Fleet
As at July 2020, Thameside had a peak vehicle requirement of 130 buses.

Upon contract renewal on 17 October 2020, route 174, will operate using 27 brand new BYD K10's / ADL Enviro400 EVs which will be Stagecoach London's first route (alongside route 173) to operate fully electric double decker buses

References

External links

Stagecoach London website

Stagecoach Group bus operators in England
2008 establishments in England